General elections were held in American Samoa on 4 November 2008 to elect a governor, members of the House of Representative, and a delegate to the United States House of Representatives, as well as a referendum on a legislative override of the governor's veto. The elections were held as part of the wider 2008 United States general election.

In the gubernatorial election no candidate received more than 50% of the vote in the first round, resulting in a runoff election between the top two candidates on 18 November, which was won by the incumbent governor Togiola Tulafono.

Incumbent U.S. House delegate Eni Faleomavaega, who affiliates with the Democratic Party was also re-elected.

Gubernatorial election

Background
Governor Togiola Tulafono and Lieutenant Governor Ipulasi Aitofele Sunia announced their intent to seek re-election on 10 May 2008. Their formal announcement, which Tulafono called "the worst kept secret of this season," took place before a crowd of approximately three hundred supporters at the Tradewinds Hotel in Tafuna.

Afoa Moega Lutu formally announced his own candidacy for Governor of American Samoa at a campaign rally at the same Tradewinds Hotel on 17 May. The rally consisted of about seven hundred Lutu supporters. Lutu promised to tackle a number of issues if elected governor, including corruption, rising food and energy prices and the economy.

Utu Abe Malae and his running mate, Nua Mailo Saoluaga, formally announced their candidacy on 10 June at a gathering at the Maliu Mai Beach Resort in Pago Pago.

This is not the first time that Tulafono and Lutu faced each other in a gubernatorial election. Tulafono defeated Lutu in the 2004 gubernatorial runoff election with 56 percent of the total vote to Lutu's 44 percent. Lutu also fell short in his bids for Lieutenant Governor of American Samoa in the 1996 and 2000 elections, losing both times to Tulafono.

The President of the American Samoa Senate, Lolo Moliga, also originally announced his intention to run for governor as well.  However, Lolo withdrew from the race on 13 June, just two months into his campaign, citing existing commitments to his extended family clan. He also noted the need to prevent divisiveness within the families of the Manu'a islands, where many of the gubernatorial and Lt. governor candidates have ancestral ties.

Four of the 2008 candidates for governor or lieutenant governor in the 2008 election either were from or had ancestral ties to the Manu'a Islands. Those with Manu'a ancestry are incumbent Lt. Governor Ipulasi Aitofele Sunia, lieutenant governor candidate Velega Savali, and both members of the gubernatorial team of Utu Abe Malae and his running mate, Nua Mailo Saoluaga.

The deadline to register as a candidate for governor in the current election was 1 September at 16:30. An official list of the four teams was released by the election office the following day.

Candidates
Togiola Tulafono – Incumbent Governor of American Samoa, affiliated with the Democratic Party
Running mate: Ipulasi Aitofele Sunia, Incumbent Lieutenant Governor of American Samoa
Afoa Moega Lutu – Former Attorney General of American Samoa, candidate for governor in 2004, affiliated with the Republican Party
Running mate: Velega Savali, former American Samoan Treasurer (2005–2008)
Utu Abe Malae – Former President of the Development Bank of American Samoa, affiliated with the Republican Party
Running mate: Nua Mailo Saoluaga, former Speaker of the American Samoa House of Representatives (1997–2002)
Tuika Tuika – Accountant, affiliated with the Republican Party
Running mate: Tee Masaniai, United States military retiree

All elections in American Samoa are officially non-partisan, but Tulafono and Sunia identify with the Democratic Party.

House of Representatives
There were 54 candidates vying for the 20 elected seats in the American Samoa House of Representatives. All seats in the House are up for election in 2008.  Every incumbent member of the House sought re-election, except for Gaoteote P. Gaoteote who is retiring. The only member who ran unopposed was Rep. Agaoleatu Charlie Tautolo.

U.S. House of Representatives
Ten term incumbent Delegate Eni Faleomavaega, a Democrat, sought an 11th term. He was challenged by Republican Aumua Amata Coleman and Independent Rosie F. Tago Lancaster.

Referendum
A referendum to allow the legislative override of the governor's vetoes was also on the ballot. 

The American Samoa Fono passed the proposal giving itself the authority to override a veto by the Governor of American Samoa. The proposal was then submitted to the Governor's office to be forwarded to the American Samoa election office as a referendum. The referendum will ask voters to agree to amend the Constitution of American Samoa to give the Fono, rather than the United States Secretary of the Interior, the power to override a veto by the Governor.

Currently, a veto can only be overridden by the United States Secretary of the Interior, who is based in Washington D.C. Any veto powers bestowed on the Fono would require a two-thirds majority in both the American Samoa House of Representatives and the American Samoa Senate before becoming law.

Results

Governor

U.S. House of Representatives

Referendum
The legislative over-ride proposal was defeated narrowly in the referendum, thereby maintaining the veto powers to the United States Secretary of the Interior.

References

External links
American Samoa Election Office

 
Referendums in American Samoa
2008 ballot measures
Elections in American Samoa
American Samoa
2008 in American politics
American Samoa gubernatorial elections
American Samoa
American Samoa
United States House of Representatives elections in American Samoa
Non-partisan elections